The Pleasant Grove Historic District is a  historic district in Pleasant Grove, Utah, United States that was listed on the National Register of Historic Places in 1995.

Description

The district's significance dates from 1853, when a fort was built that attracted expanded settlement. Development at first was within the 1853 fort's walls, and includes vernacular adobe buildings from 1853.  The district includes about a 16 block area. The listing included 134 contributing buildings.

The Vance/Lanbaugh House at 79 West 200 South, and about 20 others (comprising about 15 percent of the district), is in the California Bungalow style of architecture. This particular house was built c.1915 using native soft rock and including Bungalow features of exposed purlins and a low-pitched gable roof.

About ten percent of the historic houses are completed in Period Revival styles. For example, the Clifford L. Wright House at 90 North 100 East, built in 1933, is a Tudor Revival style house that "features the typical steeply pitched gable entry with an asymmetrically placed rounded arch doorway."

See also

 National Register of Historic Places listings in Utah County, Utah

References

External links

Georgian architecture in Utah
Victorian architecture in Utah
Bungalow architecture in Utah
Historic districts in Utah County, Utah
Historic districts on the National Register of Historic Places in Utah
National Register of Historic Places in Utah County, Utah
Buildings and structures in Pleasant Grove, Utah